Minuscule 390 (in the Gregory-Aland numbering), δ 366 (Soden), is a Greek minuscule manuscript of the New Testament, on parchment. It is dated by a colophon to the year 1281 or 1282.
It has marginalia.

Description 
The codex contains the text of the New Testament except Book of Revelation on 336 parchment leaves. The text is written in one column per page, in 21 lines per page.

The text of the four Gospels has also a division according to the smaller Ammonian Sections (in Mark 241 Sections, the last section in 16:20), with references to the Eusebian Canons (written below Ammonian Section numbers).

It has scholia.

The order of books: Gospels, Acts, Pauline epistles, and Catholic epistles.

Text 
The Greek text of the codex is a representative of the Byzantine text-type. Hermann von Soden classified it to the textual family Kx. Aland placed it in Category V.
According to the Claremont Profile Method it belongs to the textual family Kx in Luke 1 and Luke 20, and belongs to the textual cluster 74. In Luke 10 no profile was made.

History 
In 1359 the manuscript was on island Scio. The manuscript together with 386, 388, and 389 belonged to Giovanni Angelo Herzog von Altaemps († 1627).

The manuscript was added to the list of New Testament manuscripts by Scholz (1794–1852).

It was examined and described by Giuseppe Cozza-Luzi.
C. R. Gregory saw it in 1886.

The manuscript is currently housed at the Vatican Library (Ottob. gr. 381) in Rome.

See also 
 List of New Testament minuscules
 Biblical manuscript
 Textual criticism

References

Further reading 
 P. Franchi de Cavalieri and J. Lietzmann, Specimina codicum Graecorum Vaticanorum (Bonn, 1920).

Greek New Testament minuscules
13th-century biblical manuscripts
Manuscripts of the Vatican Library